The 2019 Monte-Carlo Masters (also known as the Rolex Monte-Carlo Masters for sponsorship reasons) was a tennis tournament for male professional players played on outdoor clay courts. It was the 113th edition of the annual Monte Carlo Masters tournament, sponsored by Rolex for the 11th time. It took place at the Monte Carlo Country Club in Roquebrune-Cap-Martin, France (though billed as Monte Carlo, Monaco). The event was on the 2019 ATP Tour.

Points
Because the Monte Carlo Masters is the non-mandatory Masters 1000 event, special rules regarding points distribution are in place. The Monte Carlo Masters counts as one of a player's 500 level tournaments, while distributing Masters 1000 points.

Prize money

Singles main draw entrants

Seeds

Rankings are as of April 8, 2019.

Other entrants
The following players received wildcards into the main draw:
  Félix Auger-Aliassime
  Lucas Catarina
  Thanasi Kokkinakis
  Jaume Munar

The following player received entry using a protected ranking into the singles main draw:
  Jo-Wilfried Tsonga

The following player received entry as an alternate:
  Malek Jaziri

The following players received entry via the qualifying draw:
  Guido Andreozzi
  Aljaž Bedene
  Federico Delbonis
  Juan Ignacio Londero
  Alexei Popyrin
  Andrey Rublev
  Lorenzo Sonego

The following player received entry as a lucky loser:
  Taro Daniel

Withdrawals
Before the tournament
  Kevin Anderson → replaced by  Adrian Mannarino
  Pablo Carreño Busta → replaced by  Taylor Fritz
  Richard Gasquet → replaced by  Hubert Hurkacz
  Thanasi Kokkinakis → replaced by  Taro Daniel
  Gaël Monfils → replaced by  Malek Jaziri

During the tournament
  Gilles Simon

Retirements
  Damir Džumhur
  Jo-Wilfried Tsonga

Doubles main draw entrants

Seeds

 Rankings are as of April 8, 2019.

Other entrants
The following pairs received wildcards into the doubles main draw:
  Romain Arneodo /  Hugo Nys
  Marko Djokovic /  Novak Djokovic
  Jürgen Melzer /  Dominic Thiem

The following pair received entry as alternate:
  Philipp Kohlschreiber /  Fernando Verdasco

Withdrawals
  Félix Auger-Aliassime

Champions

Singles

  Fabio Fognini def.  Dušan Lajović, 6−3, 6−4

Doubles

  Nikola Mektić /  Franko Škugor def.  Robin Haase /  Wesley Koolhof, 6–7(3–7), 7–6(7–3), [11–9]

References

External links
 
 Association of Tennis Professionals (ATP) tournament profile

2019 ATP Tour
2019 in Monégasque sport